The Mount Heaven School, also known as the Tianshan School, is a fictional martial arts school mentioned in works of wuxia fiction, most notably Liang Yusheng's Qijian Xia Tianshan. It also appears in Jin Yong's Demi-Gods and Semi-Devils as a minor school that plays an important role in the story line of one of the three protagonists, Xuzhu. The school is named after the place where it is based, the Tian Shan mountain range in western China.

History 
In Liang Yusheng's Baifa Monü Zhuan, the Mount Heaven School is founded during the late Ming dynasty by Reverend Huiming, a Buddhist monk who was formerly a military attaché under the general Xiong Tingbi. Reverend Huiming resides on Mount Heaven for several years and spends his time practising and studying martial arts. Huiming has three apprentices (Yang Yuncong, Chu Zhaonan and Ling Weifeng) who later play important roles in the novels Saiwai Qixia Zhuan and Qijian Xia Tianshan. By the early Qing dynasty, Reverend Huiming has made his name as one of the most powerful martial artists in the jianghu, while his three apprentices are also renowned swordsmen.

In Jin Yong's Demi-Gods and Semi-Devils, the Mount Heaven School has a different history and plays an important role in the story of Xuzhu, one of the novel's three protagonists. The Mount Heaven School is established by Tianshan Tonglao and it is based in Lingjiu Palace on the Ethereal Peak of Mount Heaven. In the novel, it is first introduced as a mysterious school which very few people in the jianghu, except the Lords of the 36 Caves and 72 Islands, know about. The Lords have been implanted with a deadly poison, the Life and Death Talisman, and forced into submission by Tianshan Tonglao. They are bound to serve Tianshan Tonglao for eternity and will be given an antidote once a year to ease the suffering caused by the poison if they fulfil her wishes. After succeeding Tianshan Tonglao as the ruler of Lingjiu Palace, Xuzhu frees the Lords from their suffering and they willingly pledge allegiance to him out of gratitude.

List of skills and martial arts 
 Note: The skills and martial arts listed here are entirely fictional.

 Mount Heaven Swordplay
 Divine Light of Mount Heaven
 Six Suns Palm of Mount Heaven
 Plum Twisting Hand of Mount Heaven
 Life and Death Talisman

See also 
 Tian Shan
 Tien Shan Pai

Notes 

Organizations in Wuxia fiction